Priestia is a genus of mostly Gram-Positive (Priestia flexa stains Gram-variable and Priestia koreensis stains Gram-negative) rod-shaped bacteria in the family Bacillaceae from the order Bacillales. The type species of this genus is Priestia megaterium.

Members of Priestia are previously species belonging to Bacillus, a genus that has been recognized as displaying extensive polyphyly within its members due to the vague criteria used to assign species to this clade. Multiple studies have been conducted using comparative phylogenetic analyses as a means to  clarify the evolutionary relationships between Bacillus species, resulting in the transfer of species into numerous novel genera such as Alkalihalobacillus, Brevibacillus, Solibacillus, Alicyclobacillus, Virgibacillus and Evansella. In addition, the genus Bacillus has been restricted to only include species closely related to Bacillus subtilis and Bacillus cereus.

The name Priestia was named after the British microbiologist Professor Fergus G. Priest (Heriot-Watt University, Edinbugth; 1948–2019) for his many contributions to the systematics and uses of the members of the genus Bacillus.

Biochemical Characteristics and Molecular Signatures 
Members of this genus are aerobic and found in diverse locations such as soil, faeces, upper atmosphere, inner tissues of cotton plants, sea sediment and the rhizosphere of willow roots. All members can produce endospores and most are motile. Priestia can grow in temperatures ranging from 5°C to 48°C but the optimal growth temperature is in the range of 28-37°C, so it can be qualified as a mesophile and psychrotrophic organism. Priestia aryabhattai is industrially important as it is resistant to arsenic and UV radiation allowing for an affordable alternative to conventional, expensive, metal remediation technologies.  

Two conserved signature indels (CSIs) have been identified through genomic analysis as exclusive for this genus in the proteins oligoribonuclease NrnB or cAMP/cGMP phosphodiesterase and DHH superfamily protein, and can be used to reliably differentiate this genus from other Bacillaceae genera and bacteria in molecular terms.

Taxonomy 
Priestia, as of May 2021, contains a total of 10 species with validly published names. This genus was identified as a monophyletic clade and phylogenetically unrelated to other Bacillus species in studies examining the taxonomic relationships within Bacillus. This branching pattern is also observed in the Genome Taxonomy Database (GTDB).

Two non-validly published species, "Bacillus pseudoflexus" and "Bacillus zanthoxyli", are also found to group with other members of Priestia in phylogenetic trees as well as share the same molecular markers in the form of conserved signature indels (CSIs). However, their transfer was not officially proposed due to the lack of culture strain information. Further revision of this genus is required as additional genomes and novel species are discovered and assigned.

References 

Bacillaceae
Bacteria genera